Paris Hilton's British Best Friend is a British reality television series in which Paris Hilton searches for her new best friend in London. The first spin-off of My New BFF (2008–2009), the ITV2 series was filmed around Christmas 2008 and premiered on 29 January 2009, consisting of eight episodes.

Series overview

The British version of the series, Paris Hilton's British Best Friend, premiered on January 29, 2009, on ITV2. Hilton shot the majority of the series in London, with portions of the first and last episodes shot in the U.S. Twelve women and one man competed in challenges in an attempt to become Paris' British Best Friend.

Guest stars included Charlie Sheen, Martin Sheen, Rick Hilton, Kathy Hilton, Akin Konizi, Chris Leger, Scott Henshall, Boyd Hilton, Will Geddes, Mark Durden-Smith, Jade Jagger, Kate Michelson, Jackie Collins, Tamara Beckwith, Olivia Lee, Scott Mills, Vanessa Lloyd-Platt, Callum Best, Steve Shaw, Julian Bennett, Benji Madden, Allison Melnick, Nicky Hilton and Barron Hilton. Scenes featuring Hilton partying with Katie Price as well as a performance at the BBF mansion by Good Charlotte are believed to have been shot but did not make the final cut in any episodes.

The first episode featured cameos from American BFF contestants Brittany, Onch, Vanessa, Kiki, Sinsu and Lauren while showing Paris' going away party before departing for London. In the finale, Vanessa, Onch and Lauren are seen again when Paris introduces the British finalists to some of her American friends. They are also seen with Brittany at Barron Hilton's birthday party in the same episode. Contestant Laura Meakin was added to the competition in episode two to replace Kat McKenzie, albeit temporarily, due to illness. For this reason, she does not appear in promotional material for the series. McKenzie later died, on July 3, 2009.

On March 19, 2009, it was revealed in the finale that Sam Hextall became Paris' British Best Friend.

Contestants

Episode process

 The contestant is a female
 The contestant is a male
 The contestant became Paris' new BBF
 The contestant won the challenge
 The contestant was captain of the winning team in a challenge
 The contestant was up for discussion/elimination and was saved (was in the bottom).
 The contestant could not be present at elimination due to illness
 The contestant was eliminated
 The contestant wasn't in the competition at that point
 The contestant was put up for discussion/elimination at panel and won the challenge.
 The contestant was made the Pet.
 The contestant willingly left the competition.
 The contestant was asked to leave for medical reasons.
 The contestant was eliminated outside panel.
 The contestant was chosen by the Pet to be eliminated.
TTYN Talk to you never. Paris will most likely never associate with the contestant.
TTYS Talk to you soon. Paris will most likely speak with the contestant in the future.

Notes
 In Episode 2 the Pet, Carrie, had the power to place one contestant up for discussion, she chose Chrissie.
 During the discussion in Episode 2, Laura P. walked out and quit the show (because of Carrie's "fakeness") after she said people were being fake (Carrie and Emma) and said that if they stayed she would go, because she left no one was eliminated.
 In Episode 2 Laura M. replaced Kat due to Kat's appendectomy.
 In Episode 3 the contestants themselves decided who should be up for discussion.
 Kat was eliminated in Episode 2 on medical grounds, but after recovering, Paris invited her back in Episode 4 and made her the Pet.
 In Episode 5 the Pet, Kat, decided on one person that should be eliminated, this person was Ola.
 In Episode 6 the contestants suggested who they thought should be up for discussion, they chose Kat.
 In Episode 7 Chrissie was eliminated outside of panel.
 In Episode 8 Carrie was eliminated before going to L.A.
 In Episode 8 Samuel could not enter some clubs because he was not over 21.

Episodes

Episode 1
First aired 29 January 2009

Challenge Winner: Laura P.
Bottom 2: Jade, Layla
Eliminated: Jade

Episode 2
First aired 5 February 2009

Challenge Winner: Chrissie
Bottom 2: Chrissie, Lydia
Withdrew: Laura P.
Eliminated: Kat (asked to leave)

Episode 3
First aired 12 February 2009

Challenge Winner: Team Sam, Team Flic
Bottom 2: Ola, Lydia
Eliminated: Lydia

Episode 4
First aired 19 February 2009

Challenge Winner: Sam
Bottom 2: Carrie, Layla
Eliminated: Layla

Episode 5
First aired 26 February 2009

Challenge Winner: Chrissie
Bottom 3: Meddy, Laura M., and Ola
Eliminated: Ola and Laura M.

Episode 6
First aired 5 March 2009

Challenge Winner: Carrie, Flic & Sam
Bottom 2: Meddy, Kat
Eliminated: Meddy

Episode 7
First aired 12 March 2009
Challenge Winners: Flic, Kat & Sam
Bottom 2: Flic, Samuel
Eliminated: Chrissie, Flic

Episode 8
First aired 19 March 2009
 4th Place Carrie
 3rd Place Emma
 2nd Place Kat
 Winner Samuel

Broadcast

United Kingdom
The series aired on ITV2 from January 29 to March 19, 2009. The first episode reportedly received 428,000 viewers with 2% share.

Other territories
This version aired on MuchMusic in Canada in 2009, before debuting in the United States, on April 6, 2010 through the TV Guide Network.

References

External links 
 

2009 British television series debuts
2009 British television series endings
2000s British reality television series
British television spin-offs
English-language television shows
ITV reality television shows
Reality television spin-offs
Paris Hilton
Television series by ITV Studios
Television series by Lionsgate Television